Murfreesboro City Schools (MCS) is a school district headquartered in Murfreesboro, Tennessee, in the Nashville metropolitan area of Middle Tennessee.

The district only operates elementary schools; Rutherford County Schools operates middle and high schools serving Murfreesboro. MCS also operates an Extended School Program (ESP) throughout the year from 6:00 am to 6:00 pm.

Schools
 Black Fox Elementary School
 Bradley Academy
 Cason Lane Academy
 Discovery School @ Bellwood
 Erma Siegel Elementary School
 Hobgood Elementary School
 John Pittard School
 Mitchell-Neilson Schools (separate campuses for primary and elementary)
 Northfield Elementary School
 Overall Creek Elementary School
 Reeves Rogers Elementary School
 Salem Elementary School
 Scales Elementary School

References

External links
 Murfreesboro City Schools
School districts in Tennessee
Education in Rutherford County, Tennessee
Murfreesboro, Tennessee